The Merry Wives of Tyrol is a 1964 West German musical comedy film directed by Hans Billian and starring Hannelore Auer, Gus Backus and Rudolf Prack.

The film's sets were designed by the art director Sepp Rothauer.

Cast

References

Bibliography 
 Hans-Michael Bock and Tim Bergfelder. The Concise Cinegraph: An Encyclopedia of German Cinema. Berghahn Books.

External links 
 

1964 films
1964 musical comedy films
German musical comedy films
West German films
1960s German-language films
Films set in Austria
Films set in the Alps
Films shot in Austria
Films set in hotels
1960s German films